Richard Arche (also Archer) LL.B., D.C.L. was a Canon of Windsor from 1538 to 1553

Career
He was appointed:
Vicar of Ramsbury, Wiltshire 1518
Vicar of Avebury, Wiltshire 1520
Principal of Broadgates Hall, now Pembroke College, Oxford 1526
Chaplain to Henry VIII of England 1538
Rector of Hanney, Berkshire 1543
Treasurer of Salisbury Cathedral 1551
Prebendary of Faringdon in Salisbury Cathedral 1524
Rector of Clewer 1554

He was appointed to the ninth stall in St George's Chapel, Windsor Castle in 1538, a position he held until 1553, when he was deprived of the living. He was a confessor to the Windsor Martyrs.

Notes 

Canons of Windsor
Principals of Broadgates Hall, Oxford
16th-century English Anglican priests